Toumodi F.C. is an Ivorian football club, which is based in Bassam. The club plays in Zone 4 of the Ivory Coast Deuxieme Division, and is part of the Côte d'Ivoire Premier Division.

References

Football clubs in Ivory Coast
Sport in Comoé District
Sud-Comoé